Hot Cross was a post-hardcore band from Philadelphia. They were signed to Hope Division Records and Equal Vision Records. The band was composed of former members of such bands as Saetia (vocalist Billy Werner and drummer Greg Drudy, who was also a founding member and the original drummer of post-punkers Interpol), Off Minor (bassist/guitarist Matt Smith), You and I (guitarist Casey Boland), Neil Perry, The Now and Joshua fit for Battle (bassist/guitarist Josh Jakubowski).  Their songs are composed of intricate (and in the beginning of their career, dueling) guitars heavily influenced by Drive Like Jehu. They initially signed with Level Plane in 2003.

On May 2, 2006, Hot Cross has officially announced that they had signed to Hope Division/Equal Vision Records and would be releasing their next full length on this label.

On August 10, 2006, the band announced on their website that they would be re-recording their CD originally recorded by Mike Hill. The album was recorded by former Hot Cross member Josh Jakubowski.

On July 7, 2007, the band officially announced on their MySpace that they were "indefinitely inactive," effectively ending their 7 years together and cutting their 2007 tour short.

Bass player Matt Smith is currently involved with a project called Halo of Snakes. They are scheduled to release a record on Harvcore.

Casey Boland and Josh Jakubowski began a new project called Vista Rhymes. Their first album VR:1 was made available via streaming in 2022.

Members
Billy Werner – lead vocals
Josh Jakubowski – guitar, vocals
Casey Boland – guitar, vocals
Matt Smith – bass
Greg Drudy – drums

Discography

Studio albums
Cryonics (2003)
Risk Revival (2007)

EPs
A New Set of Lungs (2001)
Fair Trades & Farewells (2004)

Splits
Split with Light the Fuse and Run (2003) (Songs: 1. "The Eye Is A Tricky Machine", 2. "In Memory Of Movern")
Split with Lickgoldensky (2004) (Songs: 1. "A Voice Turned Vacant", 2. "Patience And Prudence")
Split with The Holy Shroud (2005) (Songs: 1. "Tacoma")

References

External links
Official site
[ Allmusic]
Interview with Billy from 2011 about post-Hot Cross life
Interview with Billy shortly before the release of Cryonics
An interview with Billy from Hot Cross from Under the Volcano issue 96
Hot Cross lyrics
Hot Cross Interview at REDEFINE Magazine, March 2007
Billy Werner talks about Hot Cross, Risk Revival, Saetia with Punknews.org

American screamo musical groups
Musical groups from Philadelphia
Equal Vision Records artists
Musical groups established in 2000
Musical groups disestablished in 2007
Level Plane Records artists